The South Side Writers Group (occasionally called South Side Writers' Group) was a circle of African-American writers and poets formed in the 1930s in South Side, Chicago. The informal group included Richard Wright, Arna Bontemps, Margaret Walker, Fenton Johnson, Theodore Ward, Garfield Gordon, Frank Marshall Davis, Julius Weil, Dorothy Sutton, Marian Minus, Russell Marshall, Robert Davis, Marion Perkins, Arthur Bland, Fern Gayden, and Alberta Sims. Consisting of some twenty members, the group championed the New Realism movement and social realism. They met at the Abraham Lincoln Centre on South Cottage Grove Avenue near the Bronzeville District.

See also 
 Chicago Black Renaissance

References

African-American writers
American writers
African-American history in Chicago
American literary movements
Organizations established in the 1930s
Organizations based in Chicago
1930s establishments in Illinois
20th-century American literature